The 2015 women's road cycling season was the fifth for  (UCI code: TLP), which began as Team Skil-Argos in late 2010. On 24 September 2014 the team announced that they had secured a four-year sponsorship deal with a German hair care company. For the 2015 season the team was known as Team Liv-Plantur, with the men's team becoming Team Giant-Alpecin.

Roster

Sabrina Stultiens was the only rider who joined the team for the 2015 season.

As of 1 January 2015. Ages as of 1 January 2015.

Riders who joined the team for the 2015 season

Riders who left the team during or after the 2014 season

Season victories

UCI World Ranking

The 2015 UCI Women's Road Rankings are rankings based upon the results in all UCI-sanctioned races of the 2015 women's road cycling season.

Team Liv-Plantur finished 8th in the 2015 ranking for UCI teams.

Notes

References

External links
 

2015 UCI Women's Teams seasons
2015 in Dutch sport
2015